The Niš Symphony Orchestra (Serbian: Нишки симфонијски оркестар / Niški simfonijski orkestar) is an orchestra based in the city of Niš, Serbia. It was the first orchestra to be based outside of the capital Belgrade and is therefore highly valued.

External links 

Official website

Serbian orchestras
Culture in Niš
Musical groups established in 1953